The Association of Football Federations of Azerbaijan (AFFA) is the governing body of football in Azerbaijan. Formed in 1992, it is responsible for overseeing all aspects of the amateur and professional game in its territory.

AFFA sanctions all competitive football matches within its remit at national level, and indirectly at local level through the AFFA Amateur League. It runs numerous competitions, the most famous of which is the Azerbaijan Cup. It is also responsible for appointing the management of the men's, women's and youth national football teams and leagues.

AFFA is a member of both UEFA and FIFA.

History
The AFFA was formed on 26 March 1992, after Azerbaijan gained its independence from the USSR. On 23 February 2009, the AFFA, along with UEFA vice president Şenes Erzik, unveiled the Azerbaijan Football Academy.

In 2010, the association adopted a new logo. In 2012, the federation held an election with Rovnag Abdullayev being the only candidate, the assembly was marred with controversies.

Relationship with FIFA
The country's football association received a major blow in April 2002, when UEFA imposed a two-year ban in response to a long-standing conflict between the AFFA and majority of the Azerbaijan Premier League clubs. The domestic championship was abandoned as a result of the conflict and the top clubs prevented their players from playing for the national team, with tax officials also probing allegations of fraud at the Azerbaijan federation.

Principals

Competitions

It organizes the following competitions:
Men's football
 Azerbaijan Premier League (or Topaz Premyer Liqası); First league
 Azerbaijan First Division (or Birinci Divizion); Second league
 Azerbaijan Cup
 Azerbaijan Supercup
 Azerbaijan Futsal Premier League
 AFFA Amateur League

Women's football
 Azerbaijan Women's Football League

National teams
The AFFA also organises national football teams representing Azerbaijan at all age levels:

Sponsorship
Companies that AFFA currently has sponsorship deals with include:

Topaz - Official sponsor
Bakcell - Official sponsor
Atena - Official sponsor
Unicef - Official sponsor
Coca-Cola - Official sponsor
AccessBank Azerbaijan - Official sponsor
Clear - Official sponsor

See also
Professional Football League of Azerbaijan

References

External links

 Association of Football Federations of Azerbaijan 

 Azerbaijan at FIFA site
 Azerbaijan at UEFA site

 
Azerbaijan
Football in Azerbaijan
Futsal in Azerbaijan
Football
1992 establishments in Azerbaijan
Sports organizations established in 1992